Bronchocela smaragdina, also commonly known as Günther's bloodsucker, is a Southeast Asian species of agamid lizard.

Geographic range
 Cambodia
 Thailand
 Vietnam

References

Further reading
Barts M, Wilms T. 2003. "Die Agamen der Welt ". Draco 4 (14): 4-23. (in German).
Boulenger GA. 1895. Catalogue of the Lizards in the British Museum (Natural History). Second Edition. Volume I. ... Agamidæ. London: Trustees of the British Museum (Natural History). (Taylor and Francis, printers). xii + 436 pp. + Plates I-XXXII. (Calotes smaragdinus, new combination, pp. 319–320).
Günther ACLG. 1864. The Reptiles of British India. London: The Ray Society. (Taylor and Francis, printers). xxvii + 452 pp. + Plates I-XXVI. (Bronchcela smaragdina, new species, p. 138).
Smith MA. 1935. The Fauna of British India, Including Ceylon and Burma. Reptilia and Amphibia. Vol. II.—Sauria. London: Secretary of State for India in Council. (Taylor and Francis, printers). xiii + 440 pp. + Plate I + 2 maps. (Calotes smaragdinus, p. 185).

Bronchocela
Reptiles of Vietnam
Reptiles of Cambodia
Reptiles of Thailand
Reptiles described in 1864
Taxa named by Albert Günther